"Love More" is a song by American singer Chris Brown featuring rapper Nicki Minaj. It was released on July 16, 2013, as the third official single from the former's sixth studio album X. The song, produced by FRESHM3N III, peaked at number 23 on the US Billboard Hot 100 and number 29 on the Australia Singles Chart.

Background 
Parts of "Love More" were premiered at the 2013 BET Awards, along with "Don't Think They Know" and "Fine China". MTV praised the performance stating: "Brown hit the stage with his backup dancers in tow, sporting a black leather jacket while all the members of his crew donned sweatshirts with a neon 'X' across them, a nod to his upcoming July 16 album. For 'Fine China', Breezy kept it thematic, with images of Chinese fire dragons and fire lanterns flashing across the LED screen behind him, as he delivered his usual flawless choreography."

On March 29, 2013, Brown confirmed that Minaj will appear on his upcoming album, saying that she just gave him a "mean verse". Minaj later publicly complimented the beat of the song, stating that her fans were going to love the song. On June 30, the song premiered as a live performance by Brown and Minaj at the opening act of the BET Awards 2013. The name of the song was also confirmed to be "Love More". The track was planned to be released with the whole album on July 16, but, for unknown reasons, the release was pushed back. Minaj was asked about the song and she replied "one more week," on July 16.

The song premiered on the radio station 99.1 KGGI on July 22 at 6:30 am. It was sent to Rhythmic radio on July 23, 2013.

Music video 
The music video was filmed on August 2, 2013 in Los Angeles, California and was directed by Brown himself. The video premiered on YouTube on August 17, 2013. It features Brown taking some of his friends to a night club in his car, when he turns on the radio and the song starts. The music video features a cameo by Nick Swardson as they drive shotgun. At the club, Brown is seen flirting, singing and performing synchronized dance moves with his backup dancers, while multiple shots of Minaj are shown. The video was uploaded on Brown's Vevo channel on August 29, 2013.

Critical reception
Billboard praised the single stating: "Raunchy and sure to be a club favorite, 'Love More' is the latest single off of Brown's forthcoming album, X." AllHipHop also released a positive review stating: "Over a frenzied, dubstep-inspired club beat, Nicki and Brown exchange sexual innuendos, party recaps and their own brand of love."

Charts

Weekly charts

Year-end charts

Certifications

Radio and release history

References

2013 singles
Chris Brown songs
Nicki Minaj songs
2013 songs
Songs written by Chris Brown
Songs written by Nicki Minaj
RCA Records singles
Songs written by Eric Bellinger
Songs written by Verse Simmonds
Electro songs